The 1999 Hastings Borough Council election took place on 6 May 1999 to elect members of Hastings Borough Council in East Sussex, England. One third of the council was up for election and the Labour Party stayed in overall control of the council.

After the election, the composition of the council was:
Labour 18
Liberal Democrat 12
Conservative 2

Election result

References

1999
1999 English local elections
1990s in East Sussex